Halve Maen (English: Half Moon) is a Pirate Ship ride at Efteling theme park in the Netherlands. Designed by Ton van de Ven and manufactured by Intamin, it opened its doors in 1982.

History and details
The Pirate Ship is not actually themed as a “Pirate Ship”, but a copy of the VOC - merchant Halve Maen of the Dutch East India Co. VOC, the first limited company. The theming for the surroundings of the ride consists of a harbour in the Anton Pieck style. 

It is the largest Pirate Ship in the world, according to the Guinness Book of Records.

The ride

 Ride Height: 20 meters
 Highest Swing: 25 meters
 Maximum Speed: 54 km/h
 g-forces: 0 negative
 Capacity: 85 visitors

References

External links
 

Efteling
Pendulum rides